The Liliuokalani Botanical Garden (7.5 acres) is a city park and young botanical garden located on North Kuakini Street, Honolulu, Hawaii. It is one of the Honolulu Botanical Gardens, and open daily without charge.

The garden's site was given to the City and County of Honolulu by Queen Liliuokalani, Hawaii's last reigning monarch, and contains the Nuuanu Stream and Waikahalulu waterfall. It is under development to feature native Hawaiian plants exclusively.

See also 
Foster Botanical Garden (close nearby)
Liliuokalani Park and Gardens
List of botanical gardens in the United States

References

Honolulu Botanical Gardens
Protected areas of Oahu
Tourist attractions in Honolulu
Monuments and memorials to Liliʻuokalani